Delfina Merino (born 15 October 1989) is an Argentine field hockey player. At the 2012 Summer Olympics, she competed for the Argentina national field hockey team and the team achieved the silver medal; at the 2020 Summer Olympics, she was part of the team that won the silver medal.

Career 
Delfina also won the 2010 World Cup in Rosario, Argentina, five Champions Trophy, the World League 2014–15 and three Pan American Cups.  She was part of the 2016 Olympic squad.

In February 2018, she was elected as the best player in the world by the International Hockey Federation.

References

External links 
 

1989 births
Living people
Argentine female field hockey players
Olympic field hockey players of Argentina
Field hockey players at the 2012 Summer Olympics
Olympic medalists in field hockey
Las Leonas players
Olympic silver medalists for Argentina
Medalists at the 2012 Summer Olympics
Field hockey players at the 2011 Pan American Games
Field hockey players at the 2015 Pan American Games
Pan American Games silver medalists for Argentina
Field hockey players at the 2016 Summer Olympics
Field hockey players at the 2020 Summer Olympics
Pan American Games medalists in field hockey
Expatriate field hockey players
Argentine expatriate sportspeople in the Netherlands
Female field hockey forwards
People from Vicente López Partido
SCHC players
Medalists at the 2011 Pan American Games
Medalists at the 2015 Pan American Games
Medalists at the 2020 Summer Olympics
Sportspeople from Buenos Aires Province
21st-century Argentine women